Wila Chunkara (Aymara wila blood, blood-red, chunkara pointed mountain, "red pointed mountain", Hispanicized spelling Vilachuncara) is a mountain in the Andes of southern Peru, about  high. It is situated in the Puno Region, El Collao Province, on  the border of the districts Capazo and Santa Rosa. Wila Chunkara lies northwest of the mountain Jiwaña and the plain named Jiwaña Pampa (Jihuaña Pampa). The Jiwaña River (Jihuaña) originates near the mountain. It flows through the plain before it reaches the Mawri River (Mauri).

References

Mountains of Puno Region
Mountains of Peru